Ramnganing Muivah also known as Ram Muivah is a Retired Indian bureaucrat turned politician. He has served as an IAS Officer (Batch-1985) for 35 years and was the Secretary of North Eastern Council before retiring in 2020. He was elected to the Manipur Legislative Assembly from Ukhrul in 2022 Manipur Legislative Assembly election as a member of Naga People's Front.

References

Living people
Manipur MLAs 2022–2027
Naga People's Front politicians
1960 births
Naga people